The ETAP 30cq is a Belgian sailboat that was designed by Marc-Oliver von Ahlen as  a cruiser and first built in 2010. The interior was designed by Stile Bertone.

The design replaced the ETAP 28s in the company line in about 2011.

Production
The design has been built by ETAP Yachting in Belgium starting in 2010. It remained advertised as still in production in 2021.

Design
The ETAP 30cq is a recreational keelboat, built predominantly of glassfibre. The construction is of a polyester glassfibre and closed-cell polyurethane foam sandwich, which provides buoyancy and makes the boat unsinkable. It has a 7/8 fractional sloop rig, a plumb stem, a walk-through reverse transom, an internally mounted spade-type rudder controlled by a tiller and a fixed fin keel or optional dual tandem keels. The fin keel version displaces  and carries  of ballast, while the tandem keel version displaces  and carries  of ballast.

The design has sleeping accommodation for four people, with a double "V"-berth in the main cabin and an aft cabin with a transversely mounted double berth. The galley is located on the port side just forward of the companionway ladder. The galley is "L"-shaped and is equipped with a two-burner stove, ice box and a sink. A navigation station is opposite the galley, on the starboard side. The head is located just aft of the navigation station on the starboard side. There is a stowage area in the forepeak.

Operational history
The boat was at one time supported by a class club, the ETAP Owners Association.

See also
List of sailing boat types

References

External links

Keelboats
2010s sailboat type designs
Sailing yachts
Sailboat type designs by Marc-Oliver von Ahlen
Sailboat types built by ETAP Yachting